FAA Order 8100.8(), Designee Management Handbook, establishes "policy and procedures for the selection, appointment, orientation, training, oversight, renewal tracking, and termination of certain representatives of the Administrator" of the Federal Aviation Administration.  In particular, it is a resource for individuals interested in becoming a Designated Engineering Representative (DER).

DERs are not employees of the FAA. FAA employees must resign from the FAA before obtaining DER certification.

Subject to FAA Notice 8000.372 Manufacturing Designee Management System Implementation (2014), all Designated Airworthiness Representatives for Manufacturing (DAR-Fs) and Designated Manufacturing Inspection Representatives (DMIRs) are subject to the policy in FAA Order 8000.95, Designee Management Policy. Order 8100.8 is no longer applicable to these two designations.

See also 
 FAA Order 8110.37, Designated Engineering Representative (DER) Handbook, working procedures for DERs and FAA engineering field office staff

References

External links
 
 Regulations & Policies on the FAA website

Civil aviation in the United States
Federal Aviation Administration